The Superior Blues were a minor league baseball team based in Superior, Wisconsin, USA.  From 1933 to 1943 and from 1946 to 1955, the Blues played in the Northern League.

In 1937, they were affiliated with the St. Louis Browns. From 1938 to 1940, they were affiliated with the Brooklyn Dodgers. In 1942, from 1946 to 1952 and in 1955, they were affiliated with the Chicago White Sox.

Over the course of their history, they won two league championships. They first came in 1933 under manager Dick Wade and the second came in 1952 under Wally Millies.

In 1956, this team merged with the Duluth Dukes to form the Duluth–Superior Dukes.

While playing in Superior the team played its games at Superior Municipal Stadium adjacent to the UWS Campus. After being vacated by the Blues the stadium was destroyed by fire in 1963. A portion of UWS's Ostrander Hall now occupies the former stadium site.

Major League Players

Baseball Hall of Fame alumni

 Dizzy Dean (1942) Inducted, 1953

Other Major League alumni
1933 -- Morrie Arnovich, Rip Wade
1934 -- Morrie Arnovich, Rip Wade
1935 -- Blix Donnelly, Rip Wade
1938 -- Wally Gilbert, Pete Reiser
1939 -- Johnny Ostrowski
1940 -- Chappie Geygan, Bill Ramsey
1941 -- Len Perme
1942 -- Russ Kerns, Russ Meyer, Len Okrie
1943 -- Ernie Rudolph  Superior Bays 
1946 -- Art Johnson, Dick Strahs
1950 -- Ben Huffman, Red Kress, Ken Landenberger
1955 -- Fritz Ackley, Glen Hobbie, Hal Trosky

Notable alumni
Morrie Arnovich, a 1939 All Star for the Philadelphia Phillies and member of the 1940 World Series champion Cincinnati Reds.
Dizzy Dean, National Baseball Hall of Fame inductee (1953); pitched and played outfield for the Blues for one game on July 19, 1942, a 6-3 loss to Winnipeg at Superior.

References

Baseball teams established in 1933
Defunct minor league baseball teams
St. Louis Browns minor league affiliates
Brooklyn Dodgers minor league affiliates
Chicago White Sox minor league affiliates
Northern League (1902-71) baseball teams
Twin Ports League teams
1933 establishments in Wisconsin
1955 disestablishments in Wisconsin
Baseball teams disestablished in 1955
Defunct baseball teams in Wisconsin